Paweł Kuczyński is a Polish born political art satirist and philosopher who is anti-war.

Awards
2013: silver plate at Salon of Antiwar Cartoons in Serbia.
2010: Silver prize at the Dicaco International Cartoon Contest.
Eryk Award (named after Eryk Lipiński) by the Association of Polish Cartoonists

Exhibitions
He held an exhibition in Brussels.

In 2015 he exhibited at Cartoon Xira soon after the Charlie Hebdo incident.

External links
 Personal web site in Polish www.pawelkuczynski.com

References

Polish graphic designers
Polish caricaturists
Polish satirists
Polish male writers
Draughtsmen
21st-century Polish painters
21st-century male artists
1976 births
Political artists
Artists from Szczecin
Living people
Polish male painters